Ryan Stewart (born December 5, 1982 in Mayaro) is a Trinidadian footballer, currently without a club.

Career

College and amateur
Stewart attended Mayaro Composite High School in his native Trinidad before coming to the United States in 2003. He played college soccer at Lindsey Wilson College, where he was a three-time NAIA All-American selection in 2005, 2006, and 2007, a member of the NAIA National Championship squad as a sophomore in 2005, and the NAIA Region XI Player of the Year in 2007. Stewart completed his four-year career with 53 goals and 12 assists. He helped the Blue Raiders to the 2005 NAIA National Championship, and ranks fourth on the program's all-time goals scored list and fifth on the program's all-time points list with 118 points.

During his college years Stewart also played with the Indiana Invaders in the USL Premier Development League.

Professional
Stewart joined the Cleveland City Stars of the USL First Division in 2008.

External links
 Cleveland City Stars bio
 Lindsey Wilson bio

1982 births
Living people
Cleveland City Stars players
Indiana Invaders players
Trinidad and Tobago footballers
Trinidad and Tobago expatriate footballers
USL League Two players
USL Second Division players
USL First Division players
TT Pro League players
Lindsey Wilson Blue Raiders men's soccer players
People from Mayaro–Rio Claro
Association football forwards
Association football midfielders